Digimon Rumble Arena 2, known as  in Japan, is a 2004 Digimon fighting video game, released by Bandai for the PlayStation 2, GameCube, and the Xbox. It is the sequel to 2001's Digimon Rumble Arena and has a similar style of gameplay as Super Smash Bros. Melee, except with a health meter. Digimon All-Star Rumble, a spiritual successor to the Rumble Arena games, was later released in 2014.

Story
In Digimon Rumble Arena 2, Digimon use their digivolving techniques while participating in a battle royale to determine the strongest Digimon.

Characters
The game features Digimon from the first four Digimon anime series: Digimon Adventure, Digimon Adventure 02, Digimon Tamers, and Digimon Frontier. Each one has their own special moves and "digivolution", as well as slightly varying normal attacks and taunts.

Playable Digimon
Agumon (who can Digivolve to) Greymon & WarGreymon
Gabumon (who can Digivolve to) Garurumon & MetalGarurumon
Biyomon (who can Digivolve to) Birdramon & Garudamon
Tentomon (who can Digivolve to) Kabuterimon & MegaKabuterimon
Palmon (who can Digivolve to) Togemon & Lillymon
Gomamon (who can Digivolve to) Ikkakumon & Zudomon
Patamon (who can Digivolve to) Angemon & MagnaAngemon
Gatomon (who can Digivolve to) Nefertimon & Angewomon
Veemon (who can Digivolve to) Flamedramon & Imperiadramon Fighter Mode
Guilmon (who can Digivolve to) Growlmon & Gallantmon
Flamemon (who can Digivolve to) Agunimon & BurningGreymon

Hidden Digimon
Neemon
Omnimon
MaloMyotismon
Diaboromon
Duskmon
BlackAgumon (who can Digivolve to) BlackGreymon & BlackWarGreymon
BlackGabumon (who can Digivolve to) BlackGarurumon & BlackMetalGarurumon
BlackGuilmon (who can Digivolve to) BlackGrowlmon & ChaosGallantmon

Other Digimon
Calumon
Phantomon
D-Reaper

Reception

References

2004 video games
Rumble Arena 2
GameCube games
PlayStation 2 games
Platform fighters
Video game sequels
Video games developed in Japan
Xbox games
Multiplayer and single-player video games